Damnation Alley is a 1977 post-apocalyptic film directed by Jack Smight, loosely based on the 1969 novel of the same name by Roger Zelazny. The original music score was composed by Jerry Goldsmith, and the cinematography was by Harry Stradling Jr.

Plot
First Lieutenant Jake Tanner (Jan-Michael Vincent) shares ICBM silo duty at a US Air Force missile base in the Californian desert with senior officer Major Eugene "Sam" Denton (George Peppard).  While signing in for their work shift in the underground base, Denton notifies Tanner he is requesting that command reassign him, since he feels Tanner is not a suitable team member for their two-man crew.  While passing through base security checks, Denton and Tanner talk with Sergeant Tom Keegan (Paul Winfield). 

While Denton and Tanner are running procedure drills, the US detects incoming nuclear missiles from the Soviet Union.  After confirmation that an actual attack is in-progress, Tanner and Denton launch part of the retaliatory strike. Although interceptor missiles destroy around 40% of the incoming Soviet missiles, the United States is hit hard, particularly major cities.

Two years later, the Earth has been tilted off its axis by the nuclear detonations of World War III; radiation has mutated giant scorpions, the planet is wracked by massive storms, and the sky is in a perpetual aurora borealis-like state. Tanner has resigned his commission and has been scouting nearby Barstow, California, while Keegan (who has also left the Air Force), has been painting as an artist in one of the base's out-buildings where they have been relegated to. Mutated giant scorpions menace the area, requiring Tanner and Keegan to continually shoot the creatures with high-powered rifles. After returning from Barstow with provisions, Tanner gives an airman a stack of Playboy magazines he located.  Later, the airman falls asleep in a bunk and drops a lit cigarette, starting a small fire, which causes an explosion.  The explosions kill most of its inhabitants including the base commander, General Landers (Murray Hamilton). Keegan and Tanner are unscathed, as are Denton and Lieutenant Tom Perry (Kip Niven), who were outside, on their way to the bunker.

Denton has been considering going to Albany, New York, to find the source of the lone radio transmission that has been aired weekly since the war. He and the remaining others set out in two Air Force Landmasters—giant, 12-wheeled armored personnel carriers fitted with rocket launchers, flame throwers and cannons, capable of climbing 60-degree inclines, and operating in water. They must cross Damnation Alley, considered "the path of least resistance" between intense radiation areas.

Along their journey, one of the Landmasters becomes disabled in a storm (which also kills Perry), and they encounter mutated "killer cockroaches" in the ruins of Salt Lake City that trap and eat Keegan alive. Denton and Tanner also pick up two survivors: a woman in Las Vegas, Janice (Dominique Sanda), and a teenage boy, Billy (Jackie Earle Haley), discovered in an abandoned house in the High Plains. They fight a band of gun-toting mountain men they encounter in the ruins of a gas station in the Midwest. Denton uses the Landmaster's rocket launchers to destroy the gas station and the madmen's buildings.

As they continue their journey, the Landmaster develops a problem with its drivetrain near Detroit. Denton comments that it was "designed to use spare truck parts", semi-trucks in particular. In Detroit they enter a large wrecking yard in search of the needed parts. A large, hemisphere-wide storm comes upon the group and they take shelter in their vehicle just as a megatsunami washes them away. After the storm passes, they are adrift in a large body of water and it appears that the Earth has returned to its normal axis as the sky is clear.

Using the Landmaster's amphibious capability, they reach land. As they are making repairs, they hear a radio broadcast of music and an attempt to reach survivors. After Denton makes radio contact, Tanner and Billy set out on Tanner's dirt bike to locate the source of the broadcast. In the final scene, they reach a surprisingly intact suburb of Albany, New York, where they are greeted by its inhabitants.

Cast
 Jan-Michael Vincent as 1st Lt. Jake Tanner
 George Peppard as Major Eugene "Sam" Denton
 Dominique Sanda as Janice
 Paul Winfield as Keegan
 Jackie Earle Haley as Billy
 Kip Niven as Lt. Tom Perry
 Mark L. Taylor as Haskins
 Robert Donner as Man / Guard
 Murray Hamilton (uncredited) as General Landers

Production
Roger Zelazny's original story of Damnation Alley  was changed considerably in the final script. Zelazny was quite pleased with the first script by Lukas Heller and expected it to be the shooting script. However, the studio had Alan Sharp write a different version that left out many of the elements of Zelazny's book. Zelazny did not realize this until he saw the film in the theater. He disliked the film, but assertions that he requested to have his name removed from the credits are completely unfounded, since he did not know there was a problem until after the film had been released.

Budgeted at US $7.2 million, Damnation Alley was helmed by veteran director Jack Smight, who had scored two consecutive box office hits in the previous two years (Airport 1975 and Midway). Filming began on June 21, 1976, east of the town of Borrego Springs, California, where a missile base set was constructed, as well as locations in Meteor Crater, Arizona, Valley of Fire State Park in Nevada, Salt Lake City, Utah, and the Mojave Desert in California. The lake scenes were filmed at Flathead Lake in Kalispell, Montana.  Filming wrapped on August 13, 1976.

Production was rife with problems — the devastated landscapes and giant mutated insects proved to be nearly impossible to create, despite the large budget. For example, a sequence involving giant  scorpions attacking a motorcycle was first attempted using full-scale scorpion props, but they did not work and the resulting footage was unacceptable. The solution was to use actual scorpions composited onto live action footage using the blue screen process in post-production. Another action sequence with giant cockroaches used a combination of live Madagascar hissing cockroaches and large numbers of rubber bugs which looked unconvincing onscreen, as the strings pulling mats covered in fake insects were plainly visible.  To complicate matters, according to director Jack Smight in his memoir, studio chief Alan Ladd, Jr. redirected about a quarter of Damnation Alley'''s production budget as completion funds for George Lucas' lower-budgeted film, Star Wars. Smight was not made aware of the budget reduction on Damnation Alley until he neared its completion, which further compromised most of the remaining special effects work, for which there was now very little money left.

The original director's cut of the film delivered to the studio by Jack Smight in late-1976 ran 2 hours and 15 minutes. Even though the special effects work was not completed at that time, the studio made minor changes to the cut, and awaited the completion of the special effects work prior to releasing it.  While the effects were underway, the completion funds were diverted to Star Wars, which was having budget and production issues, which eliminated several important effects scenes which had not yet been created, including the Minuteman III missile launch sequences, the base explosion, and importantly, the storm and tsunami in the last act.  Because these scenes were cut, Fox relied on stock footage from other films (and public domain footage of missile launches and nuclear explosions) for those particular shots.

Because of this, and the last-minute decision to add "radioactive skies" in special effects, Damnation Alley was in post-production well past the intended release date of December, 1976 due to the difficult process of superimposing optical effects on the sky in about 300 shots (which were not part of the original concept, and consequently, were not planned for during filming, resulting in poor execution of the effect).  This pushed the release date from December, 1976 to March, 1977, and then again to June, 1977.  It was during this delay that 20th Century Fox released their "other" science fiction film for 1977, Star Wars. The studio had planned to release only two science fiction films that year, with Damnation Alley intended to be the blockbuster.Star Wars became a hit of epic proportions, and forced Fox to further delay and re-address a struggling Damnation Alley, which was still languishing in post-production special effects work.  In a panic, the release date was delayed to December, 1977, but moved up to October when the studio realized it would go up against the release of an expected hit, Steven Spielberg's Close Encounters of the Third Kind. With the additional delay, Fox re-edited the entire film. Smight was already involved with another project during this time, so Fox took over the re-edit. The decision was made to cut down the length of the film to the bare-minimum running time of 90 minutes for a theatrical release, and large sections of the film were edited out by the studio. These cuts amounted to 44 minutes of footage, and included a major subplot of a love triangle between Tanner, Denton, and Janice. Many scenes early in the film at the missile base were excised as well - sequences which showed the breakdown of military order. Murray Hamilton was featured prominently in several scenes which were cut, as the now-despondent and alcoholic General in charge of the base (which rendered his character literally "mute" in the final film, with no lines of dialogue). Critically, a physical confrontation between Tanner and Denton after the death of Keegan by "killer cockroaches" was removed (in this scene, Tanner blames Denton for not saving his friend from death). In spite of these major edits, Fox focused more content on the "Landmaster" vehicle, and the special effects, in direct response to Star Wars. The film underwent several name changes during this period, from the original "Damnation Alley" to "Salvation Road," and then to "Survival Run" up until shortly before the release, when it was again renamed "Damnation Alley". The film was finally released in the United States on October 21, 1977 to fleeting success when it opened, but poor critical reviews and word of mouth tanked it at the box office.

Landmaster

Perhaps the most notable aspect of the film was the Landmaster vehicle, which features a hinged center section, and a unique rotating 12-wheel assembly. The "Landmaster" was custom-built for the film at a cost of $350,000 in 1976 by automotive customizer Dean Jeffries ($1.4 million in 2010 dollars).

The Landmaster was sold to a private owner in 2005 and was restored to its original condition as featured in the film. The Landmaster was then on the show car circuit for several years. In 2007 it was featured at the San Francisco Rod & Custom Show at the Cow Palace in San Francisco, California as part of a special exhibit with other notable movie and TV cars.

Sound 360
A few big-city premiere engagements of Damnation Alley were presented in Sound 360, a high-impact surround-sound process.

Jerry Goldsmith's score made good use of the wide stereo separation afforded by Sound 360, particularly in the opening theme, with fanfares emanating from each side of the theater in turn.

Reception
In what was a departure from typical motion picture studio practice at the time, Damnation Alley opened in September, 1977 in Japan, one month prior to its release in the United States and more than a year after it was filmed. It grossed $1,250,956 in its first 9 days from 64 theaters. After its US release, it quickly left the theaters because it did not make enough to stay in the chain theaters, duplexes or triplexes. Dismissal of the film was noted, overshadowed by prior apocalypse-themed films like Day the World Ended and On the Beach. In some theaters during 1977, the film was paired with another film, Ralph Bakshi's fantasy Wizards, which was financially successful.

In the UK, Damnation Alley was released in January 1979 as a double bill with Thunder and Lightning, another 20th Century Fox film from 1977.

Television version
The network TV premiere on NBC television on Sunday, June 12, 1983 featured alternate and additional scenes re-inserted (notably, footage of Murray Hamilton and George Peppard, where Denton asks for permission to leave the missile base, as well as additional scenes with Dominique Sanda and Peppard, where Denton tells Janice about his wife who died in the nuclear war).  The network premiere was a ratings success, finishing second in the Nielsen Ratings for the week.

Home mediaDamnation Alley'' was released on VHS, Betamax, and Video 2000 formats in the United Kingdom in 1983, and on VHS and Betamax in the United States in 1985. Shout! Factory released the film (on DVD and Blu-ray) on July 12, 2011 in the United States. This release features a new anamorphic widescreen transfer, and audio commentary with producer Paul Maslansky, as well as extras including featurettes detailing the challenges in making the film, and a detailed examination of the now-famous Landmaster vehicle with designer and builder Dean Jeffries. The original "Sound 360" audio mix is not featured on the DVD and Blu-ray, as the original elements were too damaged to salvage. The film was also released on DVD in the United Kingdom in 2011.

References

External links
 
 
 

1977 films
1970s science fiction films
1970s disaster films
American disaster films
American science fiction films
1970s English-language films
Films about nuclear war and weapons
Films about the United States Air Force
Films based on American novels
Films based on science fiction novels
Films based on thriller novels
Films set in California
Films set in deserts
Films set in Detroit
Films set in the Las Vegas Valley
Films set in New York (state)
Films set in Utah
Films shot in Arizona
Films shot in Los Angeles
Films shot in Montana
Films shot in Nevada
Films shot in Utah
American post-apocalyptic films
American road movies
1970s road movies
Films about World War III
20th Century Fox films
Films scored by Jerry Goldsmith
Films directed by Jack Smight
Films produced by Paul Maslansky
1970s American films
Films set in bunkers